Orion Massif is a prominent massif located in Palmer Land, Antarctica. The highest peak is Mount Rigel.

It was named by the United Kingdom Antarctic Place-Names Committee in 1976 after the constellation of Orion.

References

Mountains of Palmer Land